The National Book Award for Translated Literature is one of five annual National Book Awards recognising outstanding literary works of translation into English administered by the National Book Foundation. This award was previously given from 1967 to 1983 but did not require the author to be living and was for fiction only. It was reintroduced in its new version in 2018 and was open to living translators and authors, for both fiction and non-fiction.

The award recognises one book published by a U.S. publisher located in the United States from December 1 to November 30. The original text need not have been published in the year of the award submission, only the translated work. For the Translated Literature award neither author nor translator are required to be U.S. citizens. 

Entries for the National Book Awards are open from March until May. A longlist is announced in September with the shortlist announced in October. The winner is announced in a ceremony in November. The prizes are split equally between the author and the translator.

Awards

This list only covers the current version of the National Book Award for Translated Literature from its new inaugural addition in 2018. Winners from 1967 to 1983 are covered in the complete list of winners of the National Book Award. 

 = winner.

2018 
The prize was judged by Karen Maeda Allman, Sinan Antoon, Susan Bernofsky, and Álvaro Enrigue and chaired by Harold Augenbraum. The longlist was announced on September 12. The finalists were announced October 10. The winner was announced on November 14.

2019 
The prize was judged by Keith Gessen, Elisabeth Jaquette, Katie Kitamura, and Shuchi Saraswat and chaired by Idra Novey. The longlist was announced on September 17. Finalists were announced on October 8. The winner was announced on November 20.

2020 
The prize was judged by Heather Cleary, John Darnielle, Anne Ishii, and Brad Johnson and chaired by Dinaw Mengestu. The longlist was announced on September 16 and the shortlist on October 6. The winner was announced on November 18.

2021 
The prize was judged by Jessie Chaffee, Sergio de la Pava, Madhu H. Kaza, and Achy Obejas and chaired by Stephen Snyder. The longlist was announced on September 15 and the shortlist was announced on October 5. The winner was announced on November 17.

2022 
The prize was judged by Nick Buzanski, Veronica Esposito, Ann Goldstein (Chair), Rohan Kamicheril, and Russell Scott Valentino. The longlist was announced on September 14 and the shortlist was announced on October 4. The winner was announced on November 16.

See also
List of literary awards
National Book Award
Best Translated Book Award

References

Translation awards
National Book Award
International literary awards